The SMH Half Marathon is a half marathon run through Sydney's central business district. The course takes in such sites as The Rocks, the Sydney Harbour Bridge, the Sydney Opera House, and the Royal Botanic Gardens.  The race starts next to St Mary's Cathedral, and finishes in Hyde Park.  Prior to 2008, the course ran a similar route, but started and finished near The Rocks.  The event has a capacity field of 10,500, and entries are often closed weeks before race day.

The event is accompanied by a fundraising initiative primarily targeted at Breast Cancer Network Australia, in memory of Kerryn McCann, who succumbed to breast cancer in December 2008.

References

External links
smhhalfmarathon.com.au

Half marathons
Sports competitions in Sydney